Subangkit (born 29 November 1960) is an Indonesian football head coach who recently coached Sriwijaya F.C. of the Liga 1.

Head coaching career
He managed several clubs during his career as a head coach.

References

Living people
Indonesian football managers
Indonesian footballers
1960 births
Indonesia international footballers
Place of birth missing (living people)
Sriwijaya F.C. managers
Indonesia Super League managers
Association footballers not categorized by position